Michael Moschen (born 1955 in Greenfield, Massachusetts) is an American juggler. He received a Fellowship from the MacArthur Foundation (the Genius Grant) in 1990, has appeared on TV on PBS, and did ads for Motorola.  Cirque du Soleil commissioned Moschen to create a new work for their permanent theatrical circus in Las Vegas, Nevada.

Moschen is particularly known for contact juggling. In the 1986 film Labyrinth the crystal ball manipulations seen to be performed by David Bowie's character were actually done by Moschen, who stood behind Bowie during filming. Since Moschen could not see the objects he was juggling, it took many takes to film the scenes with the crystal balls.

Moschen was a classmate of Penn Jillette's at Greenfield High School, class of 1973. The two worked together developing juggling performances immediately after high school.

In 1991, an episode of Great Performances entitled "In Motion with Michael Moschen" focused on his creative process and showed several of his innovative juggling routines, featuring an original music score by David Van Tieghem.  Moschen's television appearances also include An Evening at the Pops (with the Boston Pops Orchestra), Maury Povich, Penn & Teller's Sin City Spectacular, The Tonight Show, Jerry Lewis's MDA Telethon, The Montreal International Comedy Festival (Just for Laughs) on Showtime, Ricky Jay's Learned Pigs and Fireproof Women, Sesame Street, The David Letterman Show and PBS's Alive from Off-Center. Moschen is featured on the recent A&E documentary The Mystery of Genius and made his television dramatic acting debut on L.A. Law. He has also appeared on TV in England, Spain, Italy, Chile and Argentina.  In 2001, Moschen was named one of Dance Magazine's "25 to Watch".

Moschen's talk for the TED Conference describes some of his thought processes.

See also
List of jugglers

References

External links
Official Web Site

"Labyrinth: Behind the Scenes (Crystal Balls)"

1955 births
Jugglers
Living people
MacArthur Fellows
Contact juggling
People from Greenfield, Massachusetts